Thomas Liene Ness (born 5 October 1998) is a Norwegian footballer who plays as a midfielder for Jerv.

Career
Ness started his career with Jerv. Between 2018 and 2020, he played college soccer in the US for UCF Knights. On 9 April 2022, he made his Eliteserien debut for Jerv in a 4–0 loss against Lillestrøm.

References

External links

1998 births
Living people
People from Grimstad
Norwegian footballers
Association football midfielders
Vindbjart FK players
UCF Knights men's soccer players
FK Jerv players
Levanger FK players
Norwegian Third Division players
Norwegian Second Division players
Norwegian First Division players
Eliteserien players
Norwegian expatriate footballers
Expatriate soccer players in the United States
Norwegian expatriate sportspeople in the United States
Sportspeople from Agder